Yagodina may refer to:

 Yagodina, Perm Krai, a village in Russia
 , a village in Smolyan Province, Bulgaria
 Yagodina Knoll, a hill in Antarctica

See also 
 Jagodina, a city in Serbia
 Yagodny, several places with the name in Russia